The 4th Annual Streamy Awards was the fourth installment of the Streamy Awards honoring streaming television series. The awards were held on September 7, 2014 at The Beverly Hilton in Beverly Hills, California. They were hosted by the YouTube stars Grace Helbig and Hannah Hart. To reflect the industry as it had evolved since 2009, 10 new award categories were added, including multiple awards honoring the short-form video hosting website Vine, a new category to honor traditional TV media engaging in online content, and categories reflecting recent YouTube trends. The event also honored the American comedian Joan Rivers whose funeral had been earlier in the day and who many of the attendees had previously met on her web chat series In Bed With Joan, including Jenna Marbles, Tyler Oakley, and Grace Helbig, which was praised as a heartfelt moment of the show. The show was received well in media publications and generated a high level of social media interest, although it did receive criticism for the influence of sponsors at the event.

Performers 
The 4th Annual Streamy Awards featured the musical performances of the following artists:

Winners and nominees

The awards featured fan-voted submissions for the first time with the highest voted submission for each award category automatically being made one of the nominees. The nominees were announced on August 18, 2014 and the finalists for the Audience Choice Award categories were announced on August 27. 33 of the categories were announced on September 4 during the Official Streamys Nominee Reception at the YouTube Space LA. Four YouTubers were also presented with the first ever Streamy Icon Awards at a private dinner on September 5. The remaining 14 awards were announced during the main ceremony at The Beverly Hilton on September 7. Winners of the categories were selected by the Streamys Blue Ribbon Panel except for the Audience Choice awards which were put to a public vote.

Winners are listed first, in bold.

 Streamy Icon Awards

 "Activism" ICON Award – Tyler Oakley
 "Convergence" ICON Award – Pitbull
 "Entrepreneurship" ICON Award – Shay Carl
 "Inspiration" ICON Award – Michelle Phan

Web series with multiple nominations and awards

Reception 
Rae Votta of The Daily Dot felt that 4th Streamy Awards were more polished than previous years, providing the show with a greater sense of legitimacy. Similarly, Liz Shannon Miller writing for IndieWire stated that the show felt professional. She also felt that  "the most entertaining moments were off-the-cuff, organic and honest, including irreverently name-checking the sponsors and ignoring the teleprompter." Evan DeSimone of NewMediaRockstars said of the show "As usual, the night featured a bunch of hilarious off-script moments and a few technical mishaps but nothing could derail the excitement of online video's biggest night."

Votta as well as Mikey Glazer writing for TheWrap singled out Mamrie Hart's toast in dedication of Joan Rivers for praise with Votta describing it as "the evening's most somber moment" and Glazer describing it as "an authentic and intimate salute" and a high point of the night. Votta and Glazer also both positively viewed the ending performance of the night by Starship. Michael Andor Brodeur of The Boston Globe praised Grace Helbig and Hannah Hart in their role as hosts of the show, saying that they "did charmingly ironic impressions of award-show hosts, peppering their opening routine with product placements, feigning a musical number, and hacking the usual crowd roasting".

Katie Buenneke, writing for the LA Weekly, criticized the amount of corporate influence on the show, contrasting the nature of YouTube as a platform for independent content creators with the "multiple shout-outs to Coca-Cola, conspicuous integration of Samsung phones, and, most insidiously, the influence of producers like Endemol, Maker Studio and Fullscreen" at the show. However, she also noted "the night was filled with a sense of excitement about being part of a new way of connecting with audiences."

The show received a high level of social media engagement compared to leading non-sports televised shows such as Big Brother and Utopia, according to data from Nielsen and Sysomos.

See also
List of Streamy Award winners

References

External links
Streamy Awards website

Streamy Awards
Streamy Awards
2014 in American television
Streamy
2014 in Internet culture